The National Council of the Resistance (also, National Resistance Council; in French: Conseil National de la Résistance (CNR), was the body that directed and coordinated the different movements of the French Resistance: the press, trade unions and members of political parties hostile to the Vichy regime, starting from mid-1943.

Background

Various resistance movements had arisen in France since the start of the German occupation in June 1940. With the possible exception of the Francs-Tireurs et Partisans and other groups loyal to the Communist Party of France, the maquis groups were mostly unorganised and unrelated to one another. This lack of coordination made them less effective in their actions against the Nazi occupiers.

Formation and Meeting of Resistance Fighters

Charles de Gaulle, exiled in London and recognized by the UK as leader of a French government in exile, began seeking the formation of a committee to unify the resistance movements. On January 1, 1942, he delegated this task to Jean Moulin. Moulin achieved the feat on May 27, 1943 with the first meeting of the Conseil National de la Résistance in the apartment of René Corbin on the second floor of 48, Rue du Four, in Paris.

Representatives of the eight major resistance movements:

Pierre Villon (Front National)
 (Ceux de la Libération)
 (Ceux de la Résistance)
Charles Laurent (Libération-Nord)
 (Libération-Sud)
 Jacques-Henri Simon (Organisation Civile et Militaire)
Claude Bourdet (Combat)
Eugène Claudius-Petit (Franc-Tireur)
Under Jean Moulin's earlier influence, Combat, Franc-Tireur and Libération-Sud had already agreed to regroup themselves in January 1943 to create the Mouvements Unis de la Résistance, with their joint military arms forming the Armée secrète (Secret Army).

Representatives of the two trade unions which had been outlawed with the creation of the Labour Charter of the 4th of October:

Louis Saillant (Confédération générale du travail)
Gaston Tessier (Confédération Française des Travailleurs Chrétiens)

Representatives of the six main political parties of the French Third Republic: 
André Mercier (PCF)
André Le Troquer (Section française de l'Internationale ouvrière)
Marc Rucart (Radical-Socialists)
Georges Bidault (Parti démocrate populaire)
Joseph Laniel (l'Alliance Démocratique)
 (Fédération républicaine)

Arrest of Jean Moulin

However, shortly after the CNR's creation, its president Jean Moulin was arrested at Caluire by the SS. Over the next three days, Moulin was tortured by Klaus Barbie himself, and would die during his transfer to Germany. He divulged no information to his torturers and his silence was likely to have allowed the CNR to pursue its activities.

After Moulin's capture and death, the Conseil National de la Résistance decided for security reasons to end its plenary sessions and created an executive office of five members, with each member representing his own group and two others. The new office was under the direction of Alexandre Parodi, delegate-general, and Georges Bidault, the new president. On September 9, 1944, Louis Saillant succeeded Bidault as head of the CNR.

Programme

On March 15, 1944, the CNR adopted, after months of negotiations, the Programme of the Conseil National de la Résistance. The document was strongly influenced by communist groups like the Front National, especially in part II, "Measures to be taken immediately after the liberation of the territory", which envisioned the establishment of a social democracy with a planned economy in France after liberation. Some of the proposed measures were applied, at least to a certain extent, after liberation, including the nationalisation of energy (Électricité de France was founded in 1946), insurance companies (AGF in 1945) and banks (Crédit Lyonnais in 1945, Société Générale in 1946), the creation of social security programs and the independence of trade unions. They are many of the so-called acquis sociaux (social rights) of the second half of the 20th century in France.

References

 The text of this article was translated from this version of the French-language Wikipedia article "Conseil National de la Résistance".

External links
 List of members of the Conseil National de la Résistance from the archival web site of former French Prime Minister Alain Juppé,
 Description of the Conseil National de la Résistance from the Musée de la Résistance Nationale,
 Programme du Conseil National de la Résistance from Wikisource,
 France Républicaine - Conseil National de la Résistance,
 Article in the magazine l'Humanité,
 Le Programme du Conseil National de la Résistance.

Charles de Gaulle
French Resistance networks and movements
Military history of France
World War II non-governmental organizations